John McKendree Springer (7 September 1873 – 2 December 1963) was an American bishop of the Methodist Episcopal Church and The Methodist Church, elected in 1936. He was also a pioneering missionary instrumental in developing Methodism on the continent of Africa.

Birth and family
Springer was born in Cataract, Wisconsin, the son of the Rev. Henry Martin Springer, and the grandson of the Rev. Elihu Springer, both M.E. Preachers. Elihu Springer was a soldier in the American Indian Wars. Henry Springer served four years with the Colorado Cavalry during the American Civil War.  He is buried at the United Methodist mission station in Mulungwishi, Katanga Province, DRC. His grave marker indicates that he died on December 1, 1963.

The Springer family is of Swedish origin. John's mother was descended from the Scarritts family, which was involved in the Indian Missions.

Education
Springer graduated from Northwestern University (1895 and 1899). He went on to earn a B.D. degree from the Garrett Biblical Institute (1901).

Missionary service
Springer  was appointed a missionary in 1901. He was assigned as a pastor and the superintendent of the Old Umtali Industrial Mission in Rhodesia from 1901 until 1906.  During 1907 he and his wife journeyed across the African continent. He took furlough, 1907-09. Upon his return to Africa in 1910, he was stationed in the Lunda country of Angola and Belgian Congo. He held various appointments between 1910 and 1915, including Kalalua in North Western Rhodesia (1910–11), Lukoshi in Belgian Congo (1911–13), and Kambove (1913-15). He took a second furlough, 1915-16.

Upon his return to Africa in 1916, Rev. Springer became superintendent of the Congo Mission Conference, helping other medical missionaries, such as Dr. Arthur Lewis Piper, get acclimated. He returned to the U.S. in 1918 to work on the Centenary and Inter-Church World Movement projects. In 1920 he was appointed Superintendent of the Elisabethville-Luba District. In 1921 he was transferred to the Rhodesia Mission Conference to serve as Superintendent of the Mutumbara District. Another transfer occurred in 1924, when Springer joined the Congo Mission Conference a second time, again appointed Superintendent. During this time he was stationed at Panda-Likasi. A third furlough took place 1925-28, again returning to the U.S.

See also
List of bishops of the United Methodist Church

References

 Papers of Bishop John McKendree Springer, General Commission on Archives and History of The United Methodist Church (Madison, New Jersey).

External links

 Papers of Bishop John McKendree Springer, 1840 - 1961

1873 births
1963 deaths
People from Monroe County, Wisconsin
Writers from Wisconsin
Bishops of The Methodist Church (USA)
Bishops of the Methodist Episcopal Church
American expatriates in Angola
Methodist missionaries in Zimbabwe
Methodist missionaries in Angola
Methodist missionaries in the Democratic Republic of the Congo
American Methodist missionaries
20th-century Methodist bishops
American expatriates in Zimbabwe
American expatriates in the Democratic Republic of the Congo